Alinejad (Persian: علی‌نژاد‎‎) is a Persian surname that may refer to
Masih Alinejad (born 1976), Iranian journalist and writer 
Mohammad Alinejad (born 1993), Iranian football forward
Reza Alinejad (born 1985), alleged Iranian juvenile offender 

Persian-language surnames